Hukou Township is a rural township of Hsinchu County, Taiwan. Hukou had an estimated population of 81,550 in February 2023.

The Hukou army base houses the 542nd Armor Brigade of the 6th Army Corps of the Republic of China Army.

Administrative divisions
The township comprises 20 villages: Aishi, Boluo, Decheng, Fenghuang, Fengshan, Hexing, Hujing, Hukou, Hunan, Renshi, Shengli, Tungxing, Xiaoshi, Xinshi, Xinyi, Zhangan, Zhangling, Zhongshi, Zhongxing and Zhongzheng.

Economy
The township is home to the Hsinchu Industrial Park.

Education

China University of Technology, Hsinchu campus
Hsinchu county Hukou senior high school, incl. grades 7 to 9
Hsinchu county Xinhu junior high school
Hsinchu county Chungcheng junior high school
Hsinchu county Hukou elementary school
Hsinchu county Changan elementary school
Hsinchu county Xinshih elementary school
Hsinchu county Xinhu elementary school
Hsinchu county Chungxing elementary school
Hsinchu county Hexing elementary school
Hsinchu county Huaxing elementary school

Tourist attractions
 Armor School Museum
Hukou Old Street
Sanyuan Temple of Laohukou
Catholic Church of Laohukou

Transportation

Rail

The Taiwan Railways Administration serves Hukou via the Beihu and Hukou stations.

Taiwan High Speed Rail passes through the central part of the township, but there is no planned station.

Road

The bus station in the township of Hukou is called the bus station of Hsinchu Bus Corp.

Notable natives
 Joe Chen, actress, singer and television host
 Fan Chen-tsung, Magistrate of Hsinchu County (1989-1997)

References

External links

 

Townships in Hsinchu County